Margaret Fiedler McGinnis (née Fiedler) is a London-based American vocalist, multi-instrumentalist and noted guitarist.  She is best known as a founding member of UK indie groups Moonshake and Laika and as live guitarist with PJ Harvey and Wire.

Early life
She was born in Chicago, Illinois, United States, and grew up in Winnetka, Illinois and later in Connecticut. She was educated at Sarah Lawrence College and at Trinity College in Dublin.

She had attended grade school in Winnetka and played the cello growing up. McGinnis formed Child's Play with Moby as a high school band.

Musical career
After a move to London, England, McGinnis formed Moonshake in 1991 with David Callahan, formerly of The Wolfhounds. She and Callahan shared vocals, guitar, sampling and songwriting duties, and the band was augmented by John Frenett (bass) and Mig Morland (drums, percussion). Moonshake were signed to  Alan McGee's Creation Records for their debut First EP released in Spring 1991.  The group then moved to  Too Pure Records, and released the Secondhand Clothes EP and the Eva Luna LP in 1992, and the mini-album Big Good Angel in 1993.

In 1993, McGinnis formed Laika with John Frenett, Guy Fixsen, flautist Louise Elliott and drummers Lou Ciccotelli and Rob Ellis.  The band produced four albums and five singles for Too Pure between 1994 and 2003, however after Fixsen and McGinnis broke up, the band took a break. In 2000, she joined PJ Harvey to play lead guitar, cello, keyboards and percussion on the band's "Stories from the City, Stories from the Sea" world tour.

In 2008, McGinnis joined post-punk pioneers Wire replacing Bruce Gilbert on guitar for an ongoing world-wide tour.

Personal life
Following Laika's last album in 2003, McGinnis studied at the College of Law where she received a post-graduate law qualification.  After graduation, she went to work at the BBC.

In addition, she is a candle maker and instructor, who uses vintage teacups and environmentally friendly materials.  She is an animal-rights supporter.

References

External links
Mags McGinnis Official Website
Margaret Fiedler's Guitar Rig Set Up

American women guitarists
American women singers
Living people
Singers from Chicago
American emigrants to England
Sarah Lawrence College alumni
Alumni of The University of Law
Laika (band) members
Wire (band) members
American punk rock guitarists
Guitarists from Chicago
Year of birth missing (living people)
Women punk rock singers